The 2019 Portland Timbers 2 season is the fifth season for Portland Timbers 2 in the USL Championship, the second-tier professional soccer league in the United States and Canada.

Club

Competitions

Preseason

USL Championship

Match results
On December 19, 2018, the USL announced their 2019 season schedule.
All times are in Pacific time.

Standings

Results summary

U.S. Open Cup 

Due to their ownership by a more advanced level professional club, Portland Timbers 2 is one of 13 teams expressly forbidden from entering the Cup competition.

References

Portland Timbers 2 seasons
Portland Timbers 2
2019 in Portland, Oregon
Portland
Portland Timbers 2